Mount Alexandra (also known as Alexandra Mountain) is a mountain in Queensland, Australia, near the Daintree Rainforest, and part of the Mount Alexandra Reserve.

References

External links
Map

Alexandra
Landforms of Far North Queensland